The Saudi Arabian Grand Prix is a Formula One motor racing event which took place for the first time in 2021. The inaugural edition of the race was held in Jeddah, in Saudi Arabia. It was the fifth full-night race title on the Formula One calendar, following the Singapore, Bahrain, Sakhir and Qatar Grands Prix.

History 
In August 2019, plans for a permanent motorsports complex to be built in the city of Qiddiya were made public. The project was conceived by Test and Training International, a motorsports consultancy headed by former Formula One driver Alexander Wurz, with the objective of creating a world-class circuit capable of hosting all FIA categories through to Formula One. In January 2020, plans for a race track in Qiddiya were officially confirmed at an event, where track designer Wurz appeared alongside current and former Formula One drivers who were given the opportunity to drive on the layout in a racing simulator. During the event, it was confirmed that the track was designed to FIA and FIM Grade 1 standards. At the time, Formula One declined to comment on the possibility of a race.

The Saudi Arabian Grand Prix first appeared on the first draft of the  Formula One provisional calendar, which was shown to teams at a Formula One Commission meeting, held in October 2020. The draft calendar saw all 22 races from the original  calendar carried over, with the addition of Saudi Arabia. In November 2020, it was announced that the city of Jeddah would host the inaugural Saudi Arabian Grand Prix, in collaboration with the Saudi Automobile and Motorcycle Federation, and the Jeddah Corniche Circuit would be located along the shore of the Red Sea.

In October 2022, Saudi Arabia's minister of sport Abdulaziz bin Turki Al Saud expressed interest in having both Jeddah and Qiddiya host annual Formula One races or for the Saudi Arabian Grand Prix to alternate between the two venues, once the Qiddiya track opens.

Criticism 

The Grand Prix has received criticism from Amnesty International on the grounds of human rights in Saudi Arabia. Human Rights Watch also condemned the decision arguing that "it is part of a cynical strategy to distract from Saudi Arabia's human rights abuses". Formula One responded by saying that "Formula One has made our position on human rights and other issues clear to all our partners and host countries who commit to respect human rights in the way their events are hosted and delivered" and that "Formula One has worked hard to be a positive force everywhere it races, including economic, social and cultural benefits". According to Human Rights Watch, the Grand Prix and other sports events are being used by Saudi Arabia to distract people from serious human rights abuses. The Global Initiative Director at Human Rights Watch, Minky Worden, called upon Formula One to assess situation in Saudi Arabia and insist on releasing women's rights defenders who spoke in favour of women's right to drive. In February 2021, 45 human rights organizations called on Lewis Hamilton to boycott the Grand Prix, citing among other factors Saudi Arabia's role in the Yemeni Civil War and the assassination of The Washington Post journalist Jamal Khashoggi. Saudi Arabia has denied the Grand Prix was being used for sportswashing, arguing that the race forms part of the country's efforts to open itself up to the outside world. The event received criticism from human rights groups. Many accused the Arab nation and its Crown Prince Mohammed bin Salman of "sportswashing" their image. It was claimed that Saudi Arabia was stepping into some of the biggest sport events to cover its human rights violations.

Following the missile interception in Diriyah during the 2021 Diriyah ePrix, questions were raised about the event's viability. Formula One later stated that they would never go to high security risk areas, though they also stated that they had "every confidence that the Saudi government and its agencies have both the technology and capability to ensure this safety and security". During the 2021 race, Lewis Hamilton wore a rainbow-coloured helmet, showing his support for the LGBT community and showed that he wanted the rules on people in the LGBT community to change in Saudi Arabia. He also wore this helmet in the previous and following race.

The 2022 Saudi Arabian Grand Prix was impacted by the Saudi-led war on Yemen. The incident highlighted risks for the race, with drivers, such as Lewis Hamilton, raising concerns over the event’s safety. After discussions lasting several hours, an agreement was reached to hold the event. Besides the attack, there were serious questions over the years of human rights abuses in Saudi Arabia. The authoritative regime was criticised for its continued repression of dissidents, particularly in light of the mass execution of 81 people two weeks before the race.

Circuit

The circuit is located on the Jeddah Corniche, adjoining the Red Sea. It was designed by Carsten Tilke, son of the famed circuit designer, Hermann Tilke.

In Formula One, the Saudi Arabian Grand Prix race and qualifying are both held during the night, under the lights where the temperatures are substantially cooler than the day. The Formula 2 race is held during the day and two of the three Formula One practice sessions are held during daytime and high track temperatures.

Winners

By year
All Saudi Arabian Grands Prix were held at the Jeddah Corniche Circuit.

References 

 
Formula One Grands Prix
National Grands Prix
Formula One controversies
Recurring sporting events established in 2021
2021 establishments in Saudi Arabia